Tapoa may refer to:
Tapoa Province of Burkina Faso
Tapoa River in the Tapoa Province of Burkina Faso